God's Perfect Child: Living and Dying in the Christian Science Church (1999) is a book by the American writer Caroline Fraser about Christian Science and her upbringing within it. First published in New York by Metropolitan Books, an anniversary edition with a new afterword by Fraser was released in 2019 by Picador.

Fraser recalls being taught by her Christian Science father, who had a PhD from Columbia University, that matter was not real: "[M]atter was Error and error did not exist." In the 2019 afterword, Fraser describes her father's painful death from gangrene in his foot and his refusal to seek medical treatment for it, preferring to rely instead on Christian Science prayer.

Reviewing the book, Martin Gardner wrote in 1999: "No one has written more entertainingly and accurately than Fraser about the history of Christian Science after Mrs. Eddy died in 1910. No one has more colorfully covered the church's endless bitter schisms and bad judgments that have dogged it and in recent years almost plunged it into bankruptcy." According to Philip Zaleski, in a New York Times review: "Few darker portraits of  Mary Baker Eddy, founder of Christian Science have emerged since the days when Mark Twain called her a brass god with clay legs."

References

Further reading

 This also links to more letters about the article in 276 (2), August 1995, pp. 8–13, and 276 (4), October 1995, pp. 8–18.

1999 non-fiction books
2019 non-fiction books
American non-fiction books
Christian Science
Metropolitan Books books